Podroje is a small settlement in the Municipality of Šmartno pri Litiji in central Slovenia. It lies in the hills southwest of Šmartno. The area is part of the historical region of Lower Carniola. The municipality is now included in the Central Slovenia Statistical Region. 

An Iron Age hillfort has been identified on Roje Hill above the settlement.

Notable people
Notable people that were born or lived in Podroje include:
Davorin Hostnik (a.k.a. Trnovski; 1853–1929), writer

References

External links
Podroje at Geopedia

Populated places in the Municipality of Šmartno pri Litiji